Rupy's International School (Nepali: रुपीज ईन्टरनेशनल स्कुल ) is a private school based in the city of Kathmandu, Nepal. The school is located in Baphal, Kathmandu, Nepal and occupies over 4000 sq.m area (8 ropanis) of leased space. The school is well facilitated with ample classrooms, large space for pre-school, a parking area and recreational areas, including a playground and football field.

History 
Rupy's International School was established in 1982. In 1996, Rupy's International School opened doors to Primary Level students. In July 1998, the school moved to its present location in Baphal, Kathmandu. 

In 2008-09 GCE A-Levels programme under the University of Cambridge was added to Rupy's International School academics.

Academics 
The school runs

 Rupy's Pre-School
 CBSE Schools
 GCE A levels (Discontinued)

References 

Schools in Kathmandu
1982 establishments in Nepal
Educational institutions established in 1982